Wujiaqu is a sub-prefecture-level city in the northern part of Xinjiang Uyghur Autonomous Region, China, about  north of Ürümqi.

Demographics
As of 2015, 89,695 (96.4%) of the 93,058 residents of the city were Han Chinese, 1,926 (2.1%) were Hui and 1,437 were from other ethnic groups.

Wujiaqu's population is around 96,000 and predominantly Han Chinese according to the 2010 census. There are also Hui and various other minorities.

Population by ethnicity – 2010 census

Population by ethnicity – 2018 census

See also
Xinjiang Production and Construction Corps

References

Populated places in Xinjiang
Xinjiang Production and Construction Corps
County-level divisions of Xinjiang